Phyllidiopsis krempfi is a species of sea slug, a dorid nudibranch, a shell-less marine gastropod mollusk in the family Phyllidiidae. This species was named to honour Armand Krempf, a French marine biologist and director of the Nha Trang Institute of Oceanography (Vietnam) from 1921.

Distribution 
This species was described from Nha-Trang, Vietnam.

Description
This nudibranch has a white or pink dorsum with compound tubercles with white apices. It is a large Phyllidiid, growing to at least 60 mm in length. It is similar to Phyllidiopsis pipeki but that species has only two longitudinal black lines on the back.

Diet
This species feeds on a sponge.

References

Phyllidiidae
Gastropods described in 1957
Taxa named by Alice Pruvot-Fol